Livadhe is a village and a former commune in Vlorë County, southern Albania. At the 2015 local government reform it became a subdivision of the municipality Finiq. The population at the 2011 census was 1,165. The municipal unit consists of the villages Livadhja; Kulluricë; Llazat; Kalcat; Kodër; Lefter Talo; Vagalat; Gravë; Qesarat; Komat; Karroq;  Grazhdan; and Zminec (all inhabited solely by Greeks, while Sopik is inhabited by an Orthodox Albanian population and Pandalejmon by Muslim Cham Albanians. A study by Leonidas Kallivretakis in 1993 found that the population of the commune consisted of 85% ethnic Greek Christians, 10% Albanian Christians, and 5% Albanian Muslims.

References

Administrative units of Finiq
Former municipalities in Vlorë County
Greek communities in Albania
Villages in Vlorë County